A regional election took place in Upper Normandy on 21 March and 28 March 2004, along with all other regions. Alain Le Vern (PS) was re-elected President of the Council.

Results

References

Upper Normandy regional election